Kalai Strode (December 16, 1946 – November 27, 2014) was a native Hawaiian assistant director in film and television from the early 1970s to around 2010. In film he worked on North Dallas Forty.  In television he worked regularly in the series Diagnosis Murder.  He also was an actor, writer and composer.

Background
He was born on December 16, 1946 in Hollywood, California.
He was of African and Native American ancestry from his father's side. On his mother's side he was of native Hawaiian  descent. His father was professional football player and actor, Woody Strode. His mother was princess Luukialuana Kalaeloa who had done some work in films and was a hula dancer. She was also a descendant of Hawaii's last queen. He had a sister Junelehua (a.k.a. June) who was born in 1948. He also had two half-brothers. One was Hawaiian actor and entertainer, Lani Kai. The other was Hawaiian actor Lee Woodd.

Film career

1970s
He graduated from the Los Angeles Assistant Directors Training Program.

In 1971 he had a role in The Gatling Gun as the Indian Who Shoots Sneed. He was also in the credits as a stuntman in the film In the mid 1970s he was a co-writer for the western film Winterhawk. Later in the 1970s, he worked under director Richard Lang as second assistant director for the pilot episode of Fantasy Island that aired in January 1977.

1980s
In the early 1980s, he was assistant director in the John Schlesinger directed comedy film Honky Tonk Freeway which starred Beverly D'Angelo, Hume Cronyn, Jessica Tandy and Beau Bridges. In 1985, he was assistant director in the made for television drama, Challenge of a Lifetime which was directed by Russ Mayberry, and starred Penny Marshall and Richard Gilliland.  In 1988, he worked on the set of the film For Keeps.

1990s
In 1991, he was assistant director in three episodes of Tales from the Crypt, Loved to Death, Abra Cadaver and Mournin' Mess. He was assistant director in the Randall M. Miller directed 1992 comedy Class Act which starred Christopher Reid and Christopher Martin.  From 1994 to 1998 he worked in five seasons of episodes for television series Diagnosis Murder which starred Dick Van Dyke.

2000s
In 2001, having completed his work on Diagnosis Murder, he and his wife Pam moved to Honolulu. He still did some work as assistant director but also worked in transportation for movies. His wife worked in the TV series Lost for six seasons as a stand in actress. In 2010 he worked on the film Deady Honeymoon that starred Summer Glau. In 2011, he had a role as Wali in the Ua Lawe Wale episode of the Hawaii Five-0 series remake. Both of his half brothers, Lani Kai and Lee Woodd had appeared in the original series of Hawaii Five-O. Post 2011, he underwent a physical examination as part of pre-employment for The River, which was shot in Puerto Rico and Hawaii.  The examination resulted in a diagnosis of Mantle cell lymphoma.

Filmography

Writing
He had been a writer.  Around or prior to the early 1970s, Strode had composed some songs. They included "Blood Red Moon", "Childling Sun" "Oh  Mellow Day", "America Is My Home", "Love Has It's Stormy Seasons", "Me And My Magic Guitar", "Nani's Way", "A Thousand Ways", and "The Truth Is You", Another composition of his, possibly written a few years later was "Coco".

Later years
By 2010 at the age of 63, he ran as an independent candidate. While he was interviewed about his candidacy by Lee Cataluña of the Honolulu Advertiser,  he was working for Teamsters Local 996, driving and electrical rigging truck on a movie set of The Descendants. In the 2010 Special, he came 5th in a list of 14 candidates.

In 2014, he was interviewed for the documentary The Forgotten Four, which he and his wife attended the premiere for on September 9, 2014 in Westwood, California.

Illness and death
During a medical examination as part of a pre-employment physical for a movie, Strode was diagnosed with Mantle cell lymphoma, a type of blood cancer. He took five months of chemotherapy and appeared to be in remission. In 2013, as a result of a routine PET scan, it was determined that his cancer had returned. He then relocated to Grand Forks for easier access to the Mayo Clinic.

After a three-year battle with the disease, Strode died on November 27, 2014. At the time of his passing, he was helping to care for his mother-in-law.

References

External links
 
 Turner Classic Movies Kalai Strode

People from Hollywood, Los Angeles
American male film actors
Writers from California
American people of Native Hawaiian descent
1946 births
2014 deaths
Film directors from Los Angeles
Deaths from cancer in Texas
Deaths from non-Hodgkin lymphoma